

Protozoa

New taxa

Plants

Angiosperms

Monocots

Arthropoda

Arachnids

Insects

Xiphosurans

Fishes

Bony fish

Placoderms

General research
Hilton & Grande redescribe the fossil mooneyes of western North America synonymizing the genus Eohiodon with Hiodon.
Cicimurri, Paris, & Everhart describe a partial dentition from a Holocephali chimaeroid fish found in the Niobrara Chalk.

Amphibians
Jenkins, F. A., jr, Shubin, N. H., Gatesy, S. M., and Warren, A., 2008, Gerrothorax pulcherrimus from the Upper Triassic Fleming Fjord Formation of East Greenland and a reassessment of head lifting in temnospondyl feeding: Journal of Vertebrate Paleontology, v. 28, n. 4, p. 935-950.

Newly named amphibians

Archosaurs

Newly named pseudosuchians

Newly named pterosaurs

Dinosaurs
 Oviraptorosaurian eggs with embryonic skeletons are discovered for the first time in China.
 Mongolian Late Jurassic theropod fossils are found for the first time.
 A new study on morphological variation in shed theropod teeth from the Mil River Formation is published.

Newly named dinosaurs
28 new dinosaur genera were erected in 2008. Data courtesy of George Olshevky's dinosaur genera list.

Newly named birds

Other publications
 Hutchinson, J.R., Miller, C., Fritsch, G., and Hildebrandt, T. 2008. The anatomical foundation for multidisciplinary studies of animal limb function: examples from dinosaur and elephant limb imaging studies; pp. 23–38 in Endo, H. and Frey, R. (eds.), Anatomical Imaging: Towards a New Morphology. Springer Verlag, Tokyo.
 Witmer, L.M., Ridgely, R.C., Dufeau, D.L., and Semones, M.C. 2008. Using CR to peer into the past: 3D visualization of the brain and ear regions of birds, crocodiles, and nonavian dinosaurs; pp. 67–88 in Endo, H. and Frey, R. (eds.), Anatomical Imaging: Towards a New Morphology. Springer Verlag, Tokyo.

Turtles

Newly named turtles

Squamates

new taxa

New papers
 
 Everhart, M.J. 2008. The mosasaurs of George F. Sternberg, paleontologist and fossil photographer. Proceedings of the Second Mosasaur Meeting, Fort Hays Studies Special Issue 3, Fort Hays State University, Hays, Kansas, pp. 37–46.
 Polcyn, M.J. and Everhart, M.J. 2008. Description and phylogenetic analysis of a new species of Selmasaurus (Mosasauridae: Plioplatecarpinae) from the Niobrara Chalk of western Kansas. Proceedings of the Second Mosasaur Meeting, Fort Hays Studies Special Issue 3, Fort Hays State University, Hays, Kansas, pp. 13–28.
 Polcyn, M.J., Bell, G.L., Jr., Shimada, K. and Everhart, M.J. 2008. The oldest North American mosasaurs (Squamata: Mosasauridae) from the Turonian (Upper Cretaceous) of Kansas and Texas with comments on the radiation of major mosasaur clades. Proceedings of the Second Mosasaur Meeting, Fort Hays Studies Special Issue 3, Fort Hays State University, Hays, Kansas, pp. 137–155.
 Everhart, M.J. 2008. Rare occurrence of a Globidens sp. (Reptilia; Mosasauridae) dentary in the Sharon Springs Member of the Pierre Shale (Middle Campanian) of Western Kansas. p. 23-29 in Farley G. H. and Choate, J.R. (eds.), Unlocking the Unknown; Papers Honoring Dr. Richard Zakrzewski, Fort Hays Studies, Special Issue No. 2, 153 p., Fort Hays State University, Hays, KS.

Sauropterygians

New taxa

Synapsids

Non-mammalian

Mammal

Related happenings in geology

Footnotes

Complete author list
As science becomes more collaborative, papers with large numbers of authors are becoming more common. To prevent the deformation of the tables, these footnotes list the contributors to papers that erect new genera and have many authors.

References

 
Paleontology